The 2003–04 Football League (known as the Nationwide Football League for sponsorship reasons) was the 105th completed season of The Football League.

This was the last season of the Football League with the Nationwide Building Society as title sponsor, and the last in which the divisions were known as the First, Second and Third Divisions: from the following season they would be known as the Championship, League One and League Two respectively.

Norwich City won the First Division, thus returning to the Premier League for the first time since 1994–95. Also promoted to the top flight were West Bromwich Albion and Crystal Palace. Plymouth Argyle won the Second Division, while Doncaster Rovers won the Third.

Final league tables and results

The tables below are reproduced here in the exact form that they can be found at The Rec.Sport.Soccer Statistics Foundation website, with home and away statistics separated. Play-off results are from the same website.

First Division

Play-offs

Maps

Top scorers

Second Division

Play-offs

Maps

Top scorers

Third Division

Play-offs

Maps

Top scorers

See also
2003–04 in English football
2003 in association football
2004 in association football

References

 
2003